The Saciova is a left tributary of the river Covasna in Romania. It flows into the Covasna near Bita.

References

Rivers of Romania
Rivers of Covasna County